Oxycanus antipoda is a moth of the family Hepialidae. It is found in Tasmania and Victoria.

The larvae feed on grasses.

References

Moths described in 1853
Hepialidae
Endemic fauna of Australia